The Six Hours of Watkins Glen (currently sponsored as the Sahlen's Six Hours of The Glen) is a sports car endurance race held annually at Watkins Glen International in Watkins Glen, New York.  The race dates from 1948, and has been a part of the SCCA National Sports Car Championship, United States Road Racing Championship, World Sportscar Championship, IMSA GT Championship, Rolex Sports Car Series and currently the IMSA WeatherTech SportsCar Championship.

History

The first Watkins Glen Grand Prix was held in 1948 on a 6.6-mile course around Watkins Glen State Park and the village of Watkins Glen. Cameron Argetsinger, a Cornell law student and SCCA member, organized the event along with the local Chamber of Commerce. The 8-lap, 52.8-mile race was won by Frank Griswold in a pre-war Alfa Romeo 8C. In 1950, three spectators were injured during a support race, and driver Sam Collier was killed during the Grand Prix.  The 1951 event became a part of the new SCCA National Sports Car Championship series. In 1952, twelve spectators were injured and one killed when a car left the circuit in the village. This led organizers to move the course to a hillside southwest of Watkins Glen for 1953. Drivers complained of poor visibility and run-off, prompting the construction of a permanent circuit, today called Watkins Glen International, in 1956.

In 1963, the race switched to the SCCA's new series, the United States Road Racing Championship. In 1968, the race was expanded to six hours, and joined the World Sportscar Championship. Along with the 24 Hours of Daytona and 12 Hours of Sebring, the Six Hours of Watkins Glen served as an American round of the WSC from 1968 until 1981, traditionally held during the summer. With the track's bankruptcy and the FIA's decision not to return the World Championship to the United States in 1982, the event was not held again until 1984. It returned as an event for the IMSA Camel GT Championship.

Under the control of IMSA, the event was radically altered and shortened. In the 1984 running, a break was held after three hours before the race began again and completed the next three hours. This event became known as the Camel Continental. A second event later in the year was also held lasting for just three hours or 500 kilometers, and was known as the New York 500. The Continental was modified once more in 1985, this time running sports prototypes in one three-hour event, and grand tourer cars in a second three-hour event. By 1986, the event was shortened altogether, and became a single 500 mile race, then shortened once more in 1987 to just 500 km.

For several years IMSA kept the Continental as a 500 km race for prototypes in the summer, and the 500 km New York 500 for grand tourers in autumn. IMSA chose to drop the New York 500 in 1992, retaining the Continental as an event just for prototypes until 1995. In 1996, IMSA restored the Watkins Glen event to its historic format, combining prototypes and grand tourers once again.

By 1998, Watkins Glen chose to schedule the Six Hours as part of the new United States Road Racing Championship. This championship change was short lived, as the USSRC folded during the 1999 season prior to their second running at Watkins Glen, leaving an FIA GT Championship event as the year's sportscar headliner. In the wake of USRRC's collapse, the Grand American Road Racing Championship took control of the event, and retained the Six Hours since 2000 as part of the Rolex Sports Car Series. In 2014 after the merger of Grand-AM and the ALMS sports car series, IMSA regained control of the event under the United SportsCar Championship. The format of the race remains the same as it was under Grand-Am operation.

The COVID-19 pandemic caused the 2020 race to be moved to Road Atlanta, as New York state authorities would not allow NASCAR Holdings to host events.

Race winners

First street course

† Not completed; race stopped after fatal accident involving spectators

Second street course

Watkins Glen International

Notes
 Race record for distance covered.

References

Ultimate Racing History: Watkins Glen archive
Racing Sports Cars: Watkins Glen archive
World Sports Racing Prototypes:  SCCA National archive, USRRC archive, WSC archive, IMSA archive

External links
Watkins Glen International
United SportsCar Championship official site

Sports car races
Watkins Glen
Watkins Glen
Watkins Glen
Auto races in the United States
Endurance motor racing
Recurring sporting events established in 1948
Motorsport competitions in New York (state)